Dominik Tiefenthaler (born 1971) is an Austrian-German actor, mainly working in American TV and films. His work includes Gossip Girl, The Good Wife, Person of Interest, Blue Bloods, The Blacklist, Boardwalk Empire, and the dramatic films Maybe Tomorrow and An Act of War. He has also done voice-over projects, including Grand Theft Auto IV and Wolfenstein: The New Order.

Biography
Dominik Tiefenthaler was born in Switzerland, to an Austrian father and a German mother. He grew up in Kreuzlingen, a small town near Zurich, with his four sisters and one brother.
He enrolled in the Medical School of the University Zurich, and after receiving his MD Degree worked for two years in the Neurosurgical Department of the Cantonal Hospital in St. Gallen, Switzerland. He moved to New York City in 2000, studied acting with William Esper and John Dapolito, and voice and speech with Shane Ann Younts. In the spring of 2004, he co-founded the Incumbo Theater Company in New York City, but left the group after two years to focus on a career in film and television.

Tiefenthaler is the grandson of the Austrian historian and archivist Meinrad Tiefenthaler. Once married, now divorced, he lives on the Upper East Side of Manhattan.

Theatre
In 2018, Tiefenthaler played the role of the Janitor in The Lehman Trilogy at the Lyttelton Theatre of the Royal National Theatre in London. The production starred Simon Russell Beale, Ben Miles and Adam Godley and was directed by Sam Mendes. Tiefenthaler also understudied the role of Emanuel Lehman (played by Ben Miles). In August 2019, after The Lehman Trilogy had moved to the Piccadilly Theatre in the London West End, Tiefenthaler took over the role of Emanuel from Ben Miles and finished the last four weeks of the run alongside Simon Russell Beale and Adam Godley.

Film and television
In 2010, Tiefenthaler portrayed Swiss detective Yan Glassey, the lead investigator of the infamous Pink Panthers, an international gang of jewelry thieves, in an episode of America's Most Wanted.

After shooting the film , for the German TV station Sat.1 (primetime television premiere on January 8, 2011), Tiefenthaler returned to the United States to shoot Gossip Girl, where he played Lucien, the royal liaison to Louis Grimaldi.

In the following years, he played mostly guest-star characters, among them on CBS's The Good Wife ("Je Ne Sais What?"), Person of Interest ("Relevance"), Blue Bloods ("Worst Case Scenario"), and NYC 22 ("Self Cleaning Oven"), NBC's The Blacklist ("The Good Samaritan"), abc's Zero Hour ("Chain") (opposite Anthony Edwards), and HBO's Boardwalk Empire ("All In").

In 2014, Tiefenthaler was seen in three film projects: Guillaume Canet's 1970s crime drama Blood Ties, The Projectionist (a thriller about PTSD), and Maybe Tomorrow, for which he won Best Supporting Actor at the "Golden Door International Film Festival".

In March 2016, it was announced that Tiefenthaler was cast as Detective Walti Merian, in the new eight-part British drama Paranoid. The series was commissioned by ITV and produced by StudioCanal's British production company Red Production Company. Netflix will serve as a co-producer on the series, and will stream the series worldwide outside the UK.

Filmography

Film

TV

Video games

References

External links
 
 
 Biographical information and career statistics from Dominik Tiefenthal

1971 births
Living people
Austrian male film actors
Austrian male television actors
German male film actors
German male television actors
Austrian people of German descent
Swiss male film actors
Swiss male television actors
Swiss ice hockey players